EcuRed is a Cuban online encyclopedia built on MediaWiki software. The site was launched on 13 December 2010. The name is an acronym from the Spanish phrase  (literally "Cuban Encyclopedia on the Network").

Content 
EcuRed was launched by the Cuban government, is based in Wikipedia and its content is closely entwined with the Cuban Revolution. The project is written from a perspective supportive of the Revolution. For example, EcuRed's writes about Fidel Castro saying "Today he writes and participates in the struggle of ideas worldwide. Due to his moral authority, he influences important and strategic decisions of the revolution", that George W. Bush continues a long family tradition of dirty business, cheating and government intrigue, and describes the United States as “the empire of our time” and “the most powerful nation of all time.”

EcuRed states on its webpage that its goal "is the accumulation and development of knowledge with a non-profit, pro-democracy aim from a decolonizing point of view".

References

External links
 

2010 in Cuba
Online encyclopedias
Cuban online encyclopedias
Internet properties established in 2010
MediaWiki websites
Creative Commons-licensed websites